Vital Zina Kats (born 18 November 1999) is an Israeli footballer who plays as a midfielder for Portuguese club S.C. Braga in the Campeonato Nacional Feminino and the Israel women's national team.

Early life
Born in Israel, Kats moved to Toronto, Canada at the age of seven. She began playing soccer at the sage of 9 with El Salvador SC in Toronto, before later playing with Unionville Milliken SC and Scarborough GS United. With GS United, she won the 2016 Ontario Cup as women's provincial amateur champions.

College career
In 2017, she began attending Kent State University, where she played for the women's soccer team. She scored a goal in her debut on August 20, 2017 against the Cleveland State Vikings. As a freshman in 2017, Kats led all MAC freshmen in scoring with six goals and four assists, also leading the team in scoring. She was named the MAC Freshman of The Year, and was named to the All-MAC Second Team, MAC All-Freshman Team, First Team All-Ohio, and USC All-Midwest Region Second Team. In 2018, she once again led the team in scoring and was named to the USC All-Midwest Region First Team, All-MAC First Team, CoSIDA Academic All-District Second Team, OCSA All-Ohio First Team, and was a MAC Distinguished Scholar-Athlete and Academic All-MAC. In 2019, she was named to the USC All-Midwest Region Third Team, All-MAC First Team, CoSIDA Academic All-District Second Team, OCSA All-Ohio First Team, and was a MAC Distinguished Scholar-Athlete and Academic All-MAC. During the Spring 2021 season (delayed from the 2020 Fall), she was named a All-MAC Second Team, CoSIDA Academic All-District First Team, MAC Distinguished Scholar-Athlete, and Academic All-MAC.

Club career 
In 2015, she briefly played with ProStars FC in League1 Ontario.

In 2016, she played with Aurora United FC in League1 Ontario, making two appearances. She scored two goals in her debut on August 13 against Durham United FA. She was a finalist for the Goal of the Year award.

In 2018 and 2019, she played with DeRo United FC. She scored her first goal for DeRo United in a League Cup victory on June 24 against North Mississauga SC. She scored her first league goal on July 8 against Toronto Azzurri Blizzard.

In August 2021, Kats signed her first professional contract with Scottish Women's Premier League side Glasgow City F.C. She scored her first goal for the club on August 18, 2021 during a 2021–22 UEFA Women's Champions League qualifying match against Maltese club Birkirkara. She departed the club after the season.

In July 2022, she joined Portuguese club S.C. Braga in the Campeonato Nacional Feminino. She made her debut for Braga in the Supertaça de Portugal semi-finals against Benfica on 10 August, coming on as a substitute.

International career
In 2014, Kats attended a training camp with the Canada U15 team for her Canadian youth program debut. In December 2015, she won a silver medal with the Canada U20 at the 2015 CONCACAF Women's U-20 Championship, where she scored in her debut in a 7-0 victory over Jamaica U20 on December 6. In 2016, she played with the Canada U17 at the 2016 CONCACAF Women's U-17 Championship, where they finished third, and the 2016 FIFA U-17 Women's World Cup, and also played in the 2016 FIFA U-20 Women's World Cup.

She made her senior debut for Israel on 21 October 2020 during the UEFA Women's Euro 2022 qualifying.

Personal life
Kats' parents were born in Minsk, Soviet Union (now Belarus) and, being Jewish, made aliyah to Israel, where she was born.

References

External links
Vital Kats — Israeli Football Association national team player details 

1999 births
Living people
Footballers from Netanya
Israeli women's footballers
Women's association football midfielders
Kent State Golden Flashes women's soccer players
Israel women's international footballers
Israeli people of Belarusian-Jewish descent
Jewish Israeli sportspeople
Jewish sportswomen
Jewish footballers
Israeli expatriate women's footballers
Israeli expatriate sportspeople in the United States
Expatriate women's soccer players in the United States
Israeli emigrants to Canada
Naturalized citizens of Canada
Soccer players from Toronto
Canadian women's soccer players
Canadian people of Belarusian-Jewish descent
Jewish Canadian sportspeople
Canadian expatriate  soccer players
Canadian expatriate sportspeople in the United States
Glasgow City F.C. players
Scottish Women's Premier League players
Unionville Milliken SC (women) players
ProStars FC players
DeRo United FC players
S.C. Braga (women's football) players
Aurora FC (Canada) players
League1 Ontario (women) players